Nyírtét is a village in Hungary. The nearest city is Nyíregyháza (25 km).

History
The village was first mentioned in 1271. Its name is from the Turkish word "tigit".

Tradition holds that the Holy Crown was hidden here from the Austrians for a day.

External links
 Some pictures

Populated places in Szabolcs-Szatmár-Bereg County